Sten-Timmu Sokk (born 14 February 1989) is an Estonian professional basketball player for Charilaos Trikoupis Messolonghi B.C. of the Greek A2 Basket League. He is a 1.84 m (6 ft 0 in) tall point guard. He represents the Estonian national basketball team internationally.

Professional career
Sokk began playing basketball in his father's, Tiit Sokk's, basketball school. He began his professional career in 2005 with Noortekoondis/Audentes of the Korvpalli Meistriliiga. On his first season in the KML, Sokk averaged 7.04 points per game and won the KML Best Young Player Award.

In 2006, Sokk joined Dalkia/Nybit, coached by his father. He was named KML Best Young Player twice more in 2007 and 2008.

On 5 August 2008, Sokk joined TÜ/Rock, where he signed for the next four seasons. With TÜ/Rock, he won his first Estonian Championship in the 2009–10 season, after TÜ/Rock defeated Rakvere Tarvas 4 games to 2 in the finals and was named to the All-KML Team in the 2010–11 season.

In September 2012, he signed for Olimpi Tbilisi of the Georgian Superliga. Olimpi Tbilisi finished the 2012–13 season as runners-up.

On 3 August 2013, Sokk signed for Universitatea Craiova of the Liga Națională.

On 6 September 2014, Sokk signed for Rakvere Tarvas. On 22 December 2014, he left the club to join Dynamo Moscow of the Russian Basketball Super League, signing the contract on 9 January 2015.

On 17 September 2015, Sokk signed for Kalev/Cramo. He won his second Estonian Championship in the 2015–16 season, after Kalev/Cramo defeated his former team TÜ/Rock in the finals, and was named to the All-KML Team.

On 13 January 2022, Sokk signed for Charilaos Trikoupis Messolonghi B.C.

Estonian national team
Sokk was a member of the Estonian national under-18 basketball team that competed at the 2007 FIBA Europe Under-18 Championship and finished the tournament in 12th place.

As a member of the senior Estonian national basketball team, Sokk competed at the EuroBasket 2015, averaging 6 points, 2.6 rebounds and 4.2 assists in 29 minutes per game. Estonia finished the tournament in 20th place.

Personal life
Sokk's father, Tiit Sokk, is a basketball coach and a retired professional basketball player who won a gold medal in the 1988 Summer Olympics with the Soviet Union national basketball team. His older brother, Tanel, is also a professional basketball player and represents the Estonian national basketball team internationally.

Awards and accomplishments

Professional career
TÜ/Rock
 Estonian League champion: 2010
 3× Estonian Cup champion: 2009, 2010, 2011
 BBL Cup champion: 2010

Kalev/Cramo
 3× Estonian League champion: 2016, 2017, 2018
 2× Estonian Cup champion: 2015, 2016

Individual
 3× KML Best Young Player: 2006, 2007, 2008
 2× All-KML Team: 2011, 2016

References

External links
 Sten Sokk at basket.ee 
 Sten Sokk at fiba.com

1989 births
Living people
BC Dynamo Moscow players
BC Kalev/Cramo players
BC Rakvere Tarvas players
Estonian expatriate basketball people in Georgia (country)
Estonian expatriate basketball people in Greece
Estonian expatriate basketball people in Romania
Estonian expatriate basketball people in Russia
Estonian men's basketball players
Greek men's basketball players
Greek people of Estonian descent
Korvpalli Meistriliiga players
Point guards
Basketball players from Tallinn
Tartu Ülikool/Rock players
People with acquired Greek citizenship